The 10th Directors Guild of America Awards, honoring the outstanding directorial achievements in film and television in 1957, were presented in 1958.

Winners and nominees

Film

Television

External links
 

Directors Guild of America Awards
1957 film awards
1957 television awards
Direct
Direct
1957 awards in the United States